17317 / 17318 Hubballi–Dadar Terminus Express is an express train belonging to Indian Railways that links Mumbai with Hubballi in Karnataka. It runs between Dadar Terminus and Hubballi daily and is operated by South Western Railways. This train runs on LTT Mumbai→Thane→Panvel→Pune→Sangli →Miraj→Belgaum→Londa→Hubli route. Recently there is demand to provide halt at Kirloskarvadi which is a large industrial township between Sangli and Karad stations.  The halt is likely to be approved by Rail Board very soon.

Service
The Hubballi–Dadar Terminus Express covers a distance of 728 across Karnataka and Maharashtra in 15 hours and 30 minutes. As the average speed of the train is below 55 km/hr, its fare does not include a superfast surcharge. The coach composition includes 6 unreserved 2nd class coaches, 6 sleeper coaches, 1 AC 2 Tier and 1 AC 3 tier coaches.

Traction
Although the route between Mumbai &  is electrified, Hubballi–Dadar Terminus Express is hauled end to end by a WDG-4/WDG-3D/WDP-3A diesel locomotive from Kalyan shed.

Halts
The train halts at the following stations in both directions.

Alnavar

Ghataprabha
Raybag
Kudachi

References

External links 
 Route - Indianrailinfo

Transport in Mumbai
Transport in Hubli-Dharwad
Rail transport in Maharashtra
Rail transport in Karnataka
Express trains in India